Hi-Fi Set was a Japanese recording group formed in 1974, and later disbanded in 1994. The group's line-up consisted of Junko Yamamoto, Toshihiko Yamamoto and Shigeru Okawa.

History

Early Years: Debut 
In September 1974, the folk group known Red Bird was disbanded due to creative differences. Later, former members of the group Junko Yamamoto (vocal guitar), Toshihiko Yamamoto (guitar), and Shigeru Okawa (bass) decided to form their own group: Hi-Fi Set.

Breakthrough
Recording a new set of tracks, the group returned in 1975 with a Yumi Arai written song "Graduation photo" which was released simultaneously with the group debut album of the same name – same year. Throughout the year, the group re-recorded a series of Arai's song's who wrote for their album, songs such as "Cold Rain" and "Smile in the Chaoyang" which was later covered by Arai himself, these songs helped the group gain some momentum.

In 1977, Brazilian singer-songwriter Morris Albert's "Feelings" was covered by the group and it became an instant hit, the same year the group also made an appearance at the New Year annual TV special NHK Kōhaku Uta Gassen. Since then, with outstanding vocal work by Junko Yamamoto's soprano, Toshihiko Yamamoto's tenor, and Shigeru Okawa's bass voice, and an urban and sophisticated arrangement sound, the group became a very popular folk group during the heyday of new music in Japan.

During the early years in their careers, the quartet performed as opening acts for established artists of the time as the likes of Miwako Hiromatsu. The group also gained fame with hits such "My Beautiful Music" and "Sky Restaurant" which was sampled by American recording rapper J. Cole, these hit songs helped spur the group career and helped introduce them to a wider audience. In 1980, the group went into a hiatus but resumed a year later with their music, breaking a record by being the first act in Japanese music history to sing 4-beat jazz with Japanese composition.

In 1984, "I want to be honest" was released and the song became the group's most commercially successful song. With 26 single songs and 19 albums released throughout their years active as a group, In 1994 the group officially announced their disbandment and was disbanded.

Disbandment: Aftermath 
Throughout the years, Junko Yamamoto was active as a singer/ songwriter.

After disbanding, Toshihiko Yamamoto continued his career as a music producer until his death in March 27, 2014.

In 1995, groups Shigeru Okawa was arrested for an attempted theft at a supermarket in Aoba-ku, Yokohama. However, he was not charged. Ever since the group's disbandment, he has not returned to music.

Members
 Junko Yamamoto (December 30, 1949) (71 years old) was born in Tenkawa-mura, Yoshino-gun, Nara Prefecture.
 Toshihiko Yamamoto (February 23, 1947 – March 27, 2014) (67 years old) Yamamoto was born in Osaka City.
 Shigeru Okawa (b. September 6, 1945) (76 years old) was born in Mie Prefecture.

Discography

Albums

Singles

Live album

Videography

Other songs/ Projects

Unreleased songs 
 "Joy" – Toyota Motor Corporation- Toyota Carina/Carina CM song (lyric: Yu Akyu, composer: Yasuhiro Suzuki]].1988)

NHK Kohaku Uta Gassen participation history 

Notes

 The appearance order is expressed as "Appearance order / Number of contestants".

References

Japanese musical groups